Suck It Up is a 2017 Canadian drama film directed by Jordan Canning. It premiered in competition at the 2017 Slamdance Film Festival.

In December 2017, the film had its European premiere at the Frankfurt B3 Biennale, where it was awarded the Best Feature Film Award at the festival.

The film is about two best friends, both of whom have recently lost the same man - for Ronnie, her brother, for Faye, her first love.

Canning was nominated for the Directors Guild of Canada's DGC Discovery Award.

Cast 

 Erin Margurite Carter as Faye
 Grace Glowicki as Ronnie
 Dan Beirne as Granville
 Michael Rowe as Dale
 Toby Marks as Alex

References

External links 
 

2017 films
English-language Canadian films
2017 comedy-drama films
Canadian comedy-drama films
Films shot in British Columbia
Films shot in Alberta
Films directed by Jordan Canning
2010s Canadian films